Medicine Grizzly Lake is located in Glacier National Park, in the U. S. state of Montana. The lake is surrounded by high peaks including Triple Divide Peak to the west and Mount James to the north.

See also
List of lakes in Glacier County, Montana

References

Lakes of Glacier National Park (U.S.)
Lakes of Glacier County, Montana